T. Arumugam is an Indian politician and former Member of the Legislative Assembly of Tamil Nadu. He was elected to the Tamil Nadu legislative assembly as a Dravida Munnetra Kazhagam candidate from Ariyalur constituency in the 1977, 1980, and 1989 elections.

References 

Dravida Munnetra Kazhagam politicians
Possibly living people
Year of birth missing
Tamil Nadu MLAs 1977–1980
Tamil Nadu MLAs 1980–1984
Tamil Nadu MLAs 1989–1991